Hustle or The Hustle may refer to:

Film
 Hustle (1975 film), an American crime film starring Burt Reynolds
 Hustle (2004 film), an American television film about Pete Rose
 Hustle (2008 film), a film starring Bai Ling
 The Hustle (film), an 2019 American comedy film starring Anne Hathaway and Rebel Wilson
 Hustle (2021 film), a Nigerian film that revolves around a lady survival in the hustle and bustle of Lagos
 Hustle (2022 film), an American film starring Adam Sandler

Music and dance
 Hustle (dance), 1975 disco dance craze popularized by the song of the same name
 "The Hustle" (song), a 1975 song by Van McCoy and the Soul City Symphony
 "Hustle" (song), a 2019 song by Pink
The Hustle: A Brexit Disco Symphony, a 2019 album by Article 54
"Hustle", a song by Jamelia from the album Walk with Me

Television
 Hustle (TV series), a 2004–2012 BBC drama series
 Hustle (Nigerian TV series), a 2016–2018 Africa Magic drama series
 MTV Hustle, a 2009 Indian rap reality show
 The Hustle (TV series), a 2013 American comedy-drama series
 Hustle (South African TV series), a 2016 South African music drama series.

Video games
 Hustle, a 1979 arcade game in the Snake video game genre
 The Hustle: Detroit Streets, a 2005 game developed by Blade Interactive, a division of Dark Energy Digital

Other uses
 Hustle (company), a text-messaging platform
 Hustle (professional wrestling), a Japanese professional wrestling promotion 2004–2009
 Hustle, Virginia, US, an unincorporated community
 USS Despatch (1902), U.S. Navy ferry known from 1918 to 1921 as the USS Hustle

See also 
 The Real Hustle, a 2004-2011 BBC reality series demonstrating real-life scams
 American Hustle, a 2013 film
 Nipsey Hussle (1985–2019), American rapper
 Hustler (disambiguation)